Hikmet Topuzer, commonly known as Topuz Hikmet, (died 13 May 1958) was a Turkish football player for Fenerbahçe between 1909-15. He played as a right winger or right forward. He was the uncle of artist Fikret Muallâ Saygı.

The Emblem
When he was playing for Fenerbahçe around 1910, he designed the Fenerbahçe emblem.

References

Turkish footballers
Fenerbahçe S.K. footballers
19th-century births
1958 deaths

Association footballers not categorized by position